Chakrabarty is a surname. Notable people with the surname include:

Ajit Chakrabarty, music composer and music educationalist
Ajoy Chakrabarty (born 1953), Indian Hindustani classical vocalist
Akinchan Chakrabarty (c. 18th century), Bengali poet
Ambika Chakrabarty (1892–1962), Indian Bengali independence movement activist and revolutionary
Ananda Mohan Chakrabarty (1938–2020), Ph.D., Indian American microbiologist, scientist, and researcher
Arnab Chakrabarty (born 1980), Hindustani classical musician and sarod player
Dipesh Chakrabarty, Bengali historian, contributor to postcolonial theory and subaltern studies
Gaurav Chakrabarty, Indian actor, played Prodipto Lahiri in the Bengali megaserial Gaaner Oparey
Ghanaram Chakrabarty (born c. 1669), Bengali poet, contributor to the Dharmamangalkavya tradition
Kaushiki Chakrabarty (born 1980), Indian classical vocalist
Khelaram Chakrabarty (c. 16th century), Bengali poet, early poet of Dharmamangalkavya tradition
Mithun Chakrabarty (born 1950), Indian film actor, social activist, entrepreneur
Rupram Chakrabarty (c. 17th century) Bengali poet, contributor to Dharmamangalkavya tradition
Subhas Chakrabarty (1942–2009), leader in the Communist Party of India (Marxist)

See also
Diamond v. Chakrabarty, 447 U.S. 303 (1980), United States Supreme Court case dealing with whether genetically modified organisms can be patented
Chakraborty
Chakravarti/Chakravartin